Strathcona was a city in Alberta, Canada on the south side of the North Saskatchewan River. Originally founded in 1891, it amalgamated with the City of Edmonton in 1912.

History 

Strathcona's recorded history began in the 1870s. Its first residents were an offshoot of the hangers-on and self-employed contractors who resided near the old Fort Edmonton on the north side of the river. This mixed community of British (especially Orkney), Québécois, Cree and Metis fur trade employees, pioneer farmers, hunters, and their families, was mostly replaced by eastern Canadian pioneer farmers (and land speculators) in the 1880s.

The Calgary and Edmonton Railway arrived in 1891, establishing South Edmonton centred on what is now Whyte Avenue. The townsite "Plan I" was registered September 25, 1891. Businesses, at first in quickly-built primitive shacks, some made of logs, provided goods and services to a flood of immigrants from eastern Canada, Britain and continental Europe, U.S. and other parts of the world that came by train to the area. It was thought that "South Edmonton" would overwhelm "Old Edmonton" on the north side but Strathcona's geographic difficulties prevented this. However, South Edmonton was in good enough position for businesses near the railway station to prosper. Over the following 20 years the community's primitive buildings were replaced by more substantial two-storey wood or even brick buildings, many of which exist to this day.

On May 29, 1899, South Edmonton was incorporated as the Town of Strathcona, named after Lord Strathcona, Donald A. Smith. Smith was a prominent official in the Hudson's Bay Company and the Canadian Pacific Railway, that operated the Calgary and Edmonton Railway, the community's lifeline. The first mayor of Strathcona was Thomas Bennett.

In 1902, alarmed by fires that swept through many prairie communities at the time, Strathcona's town council passed an ordinance requiring that all buildings be constructed of fire-resistant materials, such as brick. This, along with the limited municipal redevelopment occurring south of the river after amalgamation, means that Whyte Avenue and the surrounding area has one of the largest stocks of vintage buildings in western Canada.

After becoming a city on March 15, 1907, Premier A.C. Rutherford, Strathcona's MLA, established the University of Alberta in the City of Strathcona in 1908, with the purchase of lands for the campus on city's the west edge. Until the first campus buildings were completed, the university found a home in the Queen Alexandra Public School, still standing on 106 Street, then in the building that is now Old Scona Academic High School.

In the 1911 census, Strathcona had a population of 5,579, while Edmonton had a population of 24,900. In anticipation of lower taxes and other benefits of being a larger city, an amalgamation of the two cities was proposed in which Strathcona and Edmonton residents voted 667-96 and 518–178 in favour of the merger respectively. The amalgamation of the two cities went into effect on February 1, 1912, resulting in increased policing and more affordable transit for Strathcona. At the time of the merger, Strathcona's boundaries were the North Saskatchewan River to the west and north, 91 Street to the east, and a combination of 62 Avenue and 68 Avenue to the south, with 111 Street comprising the brief jog between the two avenues. Whitemud Creek comprised the brief portion of the city's west boundary between 68 Avenue and the river. This included land annexed by Strathcona that was not developed until after the Second World War, well after the merger.

Today's neighbourhood of Strathcona covers the portion of the former City of Strathcona lying east of 107 Street, north of Whyte Avenue, west of the Mill Creek ravine and south of the North Saskatchewan River valley. Also, the historic commercial core of the former City of Strathcona has been designated as the Old Strathcona Provincial Historic Area.

Government 

Strathcona had seven mayors over nine stints in its over 12-year history as an incorporated municipality prior to amalgamating with the City of Edmonton in early 1912.

See also 
Edmonton annexations
List of former urban municipalities in Alberta

References 

1899 establishments in the Northwest Territories
1912 disestablishments in Canada
Former cities in Alberta
Former municipalities now in Edmonton
Populated places established in 1899
Populated places disestablished in 1912